Sister Mary Bernard Ncube (1932 – August 31, 2012) was a South African religious sister and anti-apartheid activist. As a Catholic nun, she often faced criticism from the church over her politics, including her more liberal stance on abortion. Because of her anti-apartheid activities, she was often arrested and is probably the first sister to be arrested in South Africa.

Biography 

Ncube was born in 1932 in Johannesburg. She earned a degree in theology from the Roma College in Lesotho and entered the Companions Catholic Order in 1955. She worked as a teacher until 1960.

Ncube lived at the St. Mary's Convent in Kagiso where she was known around the community as Mma Rona (Our Mother). Ncube helped establish the Federation of Transvaal Women (FEDTRAW). Previously, she had been very active with youth groups in Kagiso. In 1984, she became the president of FEDTRAW.

In 1983, she was arrested and sentenced to four months in prison for possessing "banned literature." The item in her possession was a pamphlet published by the African National Congress (ANC), which had been outlawed in South Africa.

In 1986, Ncube was arrested for attending a United Democratic Front (UDF) gathering, and was later let out on a $200 bail on the charge of attending an illegal gathering. Not long after, police with dogs raided her convent and took over 70 documents, many relating to the UDF. In March 1986, a gasoline bomb was tossed into her convent room, fortunately not harming anyone. Later that year, in June, she was detained again and "held in solitary confinement under Section 29 of the Internal Security Act for over one year." During much of that time, she did not have access to necessary medical supplies or the type of special diet she needed. Eventually she was released on bail. Ncube was banned from Kagiso in 1987. On March 17, 1988, the government dropped the charges against her.

In 1989, she was part of a UDF delegation to meet with President George Bush. Ncube went a "nation-wide speaking tour" of the United States and sponsored by Global Exchange in 1990. In 1991, she started to serve as a member of the National Executive Committee for the ANC.

Ncube was elected into Parliament in 1994 and chaired the portfolio committee on arts and culture. She became the mayor of the West Rand municipality in 2002.

See also 

 List of people subject to banning orders under apartheid

References

Citations

Sources

External links 
 Transcript of Ncube's 1983 trial (starts on p. 17)

1932 births
2012 deaths
South African Roman Catholic religious sisters and nuns
Anti-apartheid activists
People from Johannesburg
South African politicians
South African women
20th-century Roman Catholic nuns